David Coverdale (born 22 September 1951) is an English singer who is best known as the lead vocalist of Whitesnake, a hard rock band he founded in 1978. Before Whitesnake, Coverdale was the lead singer of Deep Purple from 1973 to 1976, after which he established his solo career. A collaboration with ex-Led Zeppelin guitarist Jimmy Page resulted in a '"Coverdale-Page'" studio album in 1993 that was subsequently certified platinum. 

In 2016, Coverdale was inducted into the Rock and Roll Hall of Fame as a member of Deep Purple, giving one of the band's induction speeches. Coverdale is known in particular for his powerful, blues-tinged voice as well as his vibrant, caring, and loving stage persona.

Early life 
Coverdale was born on 22 September 1951 in Saltburn-by-the-Sea, North Riding of Yorkshire, England, son of Thomas Joseph Coverdale and Winnifred May (Roberts) Coverdale. Around the age of 14, he began performing professionally and developing his voice. "I don't think my voice had broken", he explained to Sounds in 1974. "And that's when I first learnt how to sing with my stomach, which sounds silly, but it's totally different from a normal voice." Coverdale started performing with local bands Vintage 67 (1966–68), The Government (1968–72), and Fabulosa Brothers (1972–73).

Career

Early career

Deep Purple (1973–1976) 
In 1973 Coverdale saw an article in a copy of Melody Maker, which said that Deep Purple was auditioning for singers to replace Ian Gillan. Coverdale had fronted a local group called The Government, which had played with Deep Purple on the same bill in 1969, so he and the band were familiar with one another, and after sending a tape and later auditioning, Coverdale, who possesses the vocal range of a leggiero tenor, was admitted into the band, with bassist Glenn Hughes adding his own vocals as well.

In February 1974, Deep Purple released their first album with Coverdale and Hughes, titled Burn, which was certified Gold in the US on 20 March 1974 and in the UK on 1 July. In April 1974 Coverdale and Deep Purple performed to over 200,000 fans on his first trip to the United States at the California Jam.

In December 1974, Burn was followed-up by Stormbringer, which also ranked at Gold album status in the US and the UK. The funk and soul influences of the previous record were even more prominent here and this was one of the reasons why guitarist Ritchie Blackmore left the band in June 1975.

Rather than disbanding, Coverdale was instrumental in persuading the band to continue with American guitarist Tommy Bolin (of Billy Cobham and The James Gang fame). As Jon Lord put it, "David Coverdale came up to me and said, 'Please keep the band together.' David played me the album that Tommy did with Billy Cobham. We liked his playing on it and invited Tommy to audition.'" The band released one studio album with Bolin, Come Taste the Band in 1975, which was less commercially successful than previous records. The supporting tour proved difficult, with both Hughes and Bolin having drug habits. In March 1976, at the end of the final show of the tour, Coverdale reportedly walked off in tears and handed in his resignation, to which he was told there was no band left to quit. The decision to disband Deep Purple had been made some time before the last show by Lord and Ian Paice (the last remaining original members), who had not told anyone else. The break-up was finally made public in July 1976. Said Coverdale in an interview: "I was frightened to leave the band. Purple was my life, Purple gave me my break, but all the same I wanted out."

Solo (1977–1978) 
After the demise of Deep Purple, Coverdale embarked on a solo career. He released his first album in February 1977, titled White Snake. All songs were written by Coverdale and guitarist Micky Moody. As his first solo effort, Coverdale later admitted: "It's very difficult to think back and talk sensibly about the first album. White Snake had been a very inward-looking, reflective and low-key affair in many ways, written and recorded as it was in the aftermath of the collapse of Deep Purple." Even though the album was not successful, its title  inspired the name of Coverdale's future band.

In 1978, Coverdale released his second solo album Northwinds, which was received much better than the previous album. But before the album's release, he had already formed a new band.

Early Whitesnake era (1978–1982) 

After recording Northwinds, Coverdale soon formed the band Whitesnake, with Bernie Marsden and Micky Moody both handling guitar duties. Although this was originally a touring band for Coverdale's first solo album, it soon developed into a full-time band. In early 1978, the band released the Snakebite EP, which was later repackaged as a full album (titled Snakebite, released in June 1978), with the B-side taken from Coverdale's Northwinds album. For the follow-up album, Trouble, Coverdale was joined by his former Deep Purple colleague, keyboardist Jon Lord. For Whitesnake's 1980 album, Ready an' Willing, drummer Ian Paice also joined the group. Ready an' Willing also featured the band's biggest hit up to that point, the song "Fool for Your Loving", which reached No. 13 on the British charts and No. 53 on the US Billboard Hot 100. Ready an' Willing was followed up by the even more successful Come an' Get It in 1981. During 1982 Coverdale took some time off to look after his sick daughter and decided to put Whitesnake on hold. When David Coverdale returned to music he reformed the band, which thereafter recorded the album Saints & Sinners. 

In 1982, according to British heavy metal magazine Kerrang!, Coverdale was considered for the vocalist position with Black Sabbath following the departure of Ronnie James Dio, which he declined.

Breakthrough

International success of Whitesnake (1983–1991) 

Whitesnake gained significant popularity in the UK, Europe, and Asia, but North American success remained elusive. In 1984, the album Slide It In dented the US charts (reaching #40), but not enough to be considered a hit. In time for the US release of Slide It In, Coverdale made a calculated attempt at updating Whitesnake's sound and look by recruiting guitarist John Sykes from the remnants of Thin Lizzy. Sykes brought a more contemporary, aggressive guitar sound with him and had stage manners to match. The last remaining Deep Purple connections were severed when Jon Lord left after recording Slide It In to re-form Deep Purple. (Ian Paice had left Whitesnake in 1982.)

In 1985, Sykes and Coverdale started working on new songs for the next album, but Coverdale soon contracted a serious sinus infection that made recording close to impossible for much of 1986 and which had doctors thinking he might never sing again. Coverdale eventually recovered, and recordings were continued. But before their upcoming album was fully recorded and released, Coverdale had dismissed Sykes from the band. The split with Sykes was, reportedly, not amicable.

In many period interviews, Coverdale stated that the next album was a make-or-break album for Whitesnake, and if not successful he would disband Whitesnake altogether. During 1987 and 1988, North America was finally won over, with the multi-platinum self-titled Whitesnake album, co-written for the most part with now-departed Sykes, but including guitar virtuoso Adrian Vandenberg, as a session musician.

The 1987 album has sold eight times platinum since its release, propelled by hit singles such as "Here I Go Again" and "Is This Love", and finally made Whitesnake a bona fide concert headliner in North America. Through the late 1980s and early 1990s, caught in the "hair-band" era, Coverdale kept Whitesnake going with great success despite changing line-ups.

In 1989, Coverdale recruited Vandenberg to record a new album, Slip of the Tongue. Vandenberg co-wrote the entire album with Coverdale, but a wrist injury sidelined him from contributing the solo guitar work. Steve Vai was recruited, re-recording most of Vandenberg's existing parts and finishing the album. Upon release, it was a great commercial success in Europe and the US.

The album peaked at number 10 in the US, and has achieved platinum status. Critical response was mixed, with Allmusic critics Steve Erlwine and Greg Prato noting that despite high sales, Slip of the Tongue "was a considerable disappointment after the across-the-board success of Whitesnake". The following tour, for which Vandenberg returned to play along with Vai, cemented Whitesnake's reputation as a giant in the world of hard rock. The tour continued until the end of 1990.

At that point Coverdale had grown uncomfortable with the entity he felt Whitesnake had become, and admitted that he got "caught up in it". In one interview, Coverdale stated:

It got louder and louder, and so did I, to the point now where I have to get dressed up like a "girly man" and tease one's questionable bangs or hair and it's all becoming a bit... boring.

In 1990, Coverdale sang and co-wrote (with Hans Zimmer and Billy Idol) the song "The Last Note of Freedom" for the Tony Scott film Days of Thunder.

On 26 September 1990, after the last show on the Slip of the Tongue tour in Tokyo, Coverdale disbanded Whitesnake indefinitely. Tired of the business in general, the rigors of touring and troubled by his separation and later divorce from Tawny Kitaen, Coverdale wanted to find other values in life and took "private time to reflect" and re-assess his career direction.

Coverdale and Page (1991–1993) 
In the early spring of 1991, a collaboration was set up with guitarist Jimmy Page of Led Zeppelin fame. Both parties have said that the collaboration revitalised them on many levels. This collaboration resulted in the Coverdale-Page album released in March 1993. The album was a hit all over the world reaching number 4 in the UK and number 5 in the US, and was certified Platinum in the US on 7 April 1995, but the US tour for the album had to be cancelled due to slow ticket sales. After a limited Japanese tour, Coverdale and Page parted ways. In part, the problem had been the vocal comparisons to Robert Plant who had fronted Led Zeppelin. Some of their audience criticised Coverdale, feeling he was merely a Plant clone; Plant himself referred to the team-up as 'David Cover-version'. Others felt the short-lived collaboration only served to inspire Page to once again hook up with Plant, a year later.

Later years

Return of Whitesnake (1994, 1997–1998) 
In 1994, Coverdale assembled a new line-up of Whitesnake (with the exception of Coverdale's musical partner, guitarist Adrian Vandenberg and bassist Rudy Sarzo, both of whom had been in Whitesnake since 1987) to tour for the release of Whitesnake's Greatest Hits album. The band again broke up after the tour. After this Coverdale once again retreated from the music business, for three years. In 1997 Coverdale returned and released Restless Heart (with Vandenberg on guitar). The album was originally supposed to be Coverdale's solo album, but the record company forced it to be released under the moniker "David Coverdale & Whitesnake". The tour was billed as Whitesnake's farewell tour, during which Coverdale and Vandenberg played two unplugged shows, one in Japan and the other for VH1.  The first of the two shows was released the next year under the title Starkers in Tokyo. After the Restless Heart-tour ended, Coverdale once again folded Whitesnake and took another short break from music.

Back to solo (1999–2002) 
In 2000, Coverdale released his first solo album in 22 years, titled Into The Light. Even though the album was not a hit, it did return Coverdale to the music business.

Re-reformation of Whitesnake (2002–present) 

In December 2002, Coverdale re-reformed Whitesnake for an American and European tour, with Tommy Aldridge on drums, Marco Mendoza (bass), Doug Aldrich (guitar), Reb Beach (ex-Winger guitarist) and keyboardist Timothy Drury. 2004–2005 saw Whitesnake embark on a tour of the United States, South America and Europe. A live DVD, shot during the 2004 tour at the legendary Hammersmith Apollo was released in February 2006. In June 2006 Coverdale signed a new record deal with Steamhammer Records. The first release under the new contract was the double live album Live: In the Shadow of the Blues (released 27 November 2006); the album also contained 4 brand new studio tracks written by Coverdale and Aldrich.

In 2008, the band (with a new bassist and drummer) released its first new studio album in over 10 years titled Good to Be Bad. The band toured the album extensively. Also in 2008, Whitesnake embarked on a European Tour as part of a double bill with fellow Yorkshire rockers Def Leppard.

In 2009, Whitesnake toured with Judas Priest on the British Steel 30th Anniversary Tour. On 11 August 2009 Whitesnake were playing a show at Red Rocks Amphitheatre in Morrison, Colorado when Coverdale suffered some kind of vocal injury. After seeing a specialist, it was announced on 12 August 2009 that Coverdale had been suffering from severe vocal fold edema and a left vocal fold vascular lesion. The remainder of the tour with Judas Priest was cancelled so that this injury would not worsen.

In early February 2010, Coverdale announced that his voice had seemed to have fully recovered from the trauma that sidelined him and the band on the Priest tour. He stated he had been recording new demos, aiming for a new Whitesnake album, and that on tape his voice was sounding full and strong. The studio album Forevermore was released on 25 March 2011, with Aldrich and Beach on board.

In May 2015, with the addition of guitar virtuoso Joel Hoekstra (formerly Of Night Ranger) the band released The Purple Album with cover versions of the songs that Coverdale had originally performed with Deep Purple. It was followed by a tour.

In 2016, Whitesnake embarked on the "Great Hits" tour, in selected cities in North America and Europe. In 2022, the band began their COVID-delayed farewell tour with European dates kicking off in Dublin on 10 May 2022, but were able to continue only until their date in Croatia on 2 July 2022. After cancelling the last 11 dates of the European leg of the tour due to health problems affecting various band members including Reb Beach, Tommy Aldridge and Coverdale himself, Whitesnake subsequently cancelled the entire 2022 North American leg of its Farewell Tour as Coverdale was forced to deal with ongoing respiratory health issues affecting his sinuses and trachea.

Personal life 
Coverdale was married in 1974 to Julia Borkowski from Poland, and their daughter Jessica was born in 1978. 
Coverdale's second marriage was to former model and actress Tawny Kitaen, from 17 February 1989 until they divorced two years later, in April 1991. Kitaen was known for her provocative appearances in Whitesnake's music videos for "Here I Go Again", "Is This Love", and "Still of the Night". 
Since 1997, he has lived with his third wife, Cindy, an author (The Food That Rocks); they have one son named Jasper.

On 1 March 2007, Coverdale became a US citizen, in a ceremony in Reno, Nevada, and now holds dual US/UK citizenship. He has lived in Incline Village, Nevada for more than 20 years.

Discography

Solo 
 1977 White Snake
 1978 Northwinds
 1990 "The Last Note of Freedom" – song featured on the Days of Thunder soundtrack
 1993 Coverdale–Page (with ex-Led Zeppelin guitarist Jimmy Page)
 2000 Into the Light

Guest performances 
1974 Roger Glover – The Butterfly Ball and the Grasshopper's Feast ("Behind the Smile")
1974 Jon Lord – Windows – 2nd Movement, Gemini
1976 Eddie Hardin – Wizard's Convention ("Money To Burn")
1978 Barbi Benton – Ain't That Just The Way (co-writer of "Up in the Air")
1990 Steve Vai – Passion and Warfare ("For the Love of God")
1992 Bernie Marsden – The Friday Rock Show Sessions (four live recordings from 1981: "Who's Fooling Who?", "Shakey Ground", "Look At Me Now", "Byblos Shack")
1995 Young & Moody – The Nearest Hits Album (co-writer of "Sunrise To Sunset")
2000 Bernie Marsden – And About Time Too ("Who's Fooling Who", live recording from '81, only on reissue of the album)
2003 Tony Franklin – Wonderland ("Sunshine Lady")
2014 Adrian Vandenberg – Moonkings ("Sailing Ships")
2014 Bernie Marsden – Shine ("Trouble")
2015 Phil Collen's Delta Deep – Delta Deep ("Private Number")

Film and TV appearances 
1977 The Butterfly Ball
1990 Days of Thunder
2011 Metal Evolution
2012 A Passion for the Vine
2013 Behind The Music Remastered, ep. Deep Purple
2016 Here I Go Again: David Coverdale

References

External links 

 
 
 Official site

1951 births
Living people
20th-century English male singers
20th-century English singers
21st-century English male singers
21st-century English singers
English rock musicians
English heavy metal singers
English male singers
English rock singers
English baritones
British hard rock musicians
Blues rock musicians
Glam metal musicians
Deep Purple members
Whitesnake members
Singers from Nevada
English emigrants to the United States
Musicians from Yorkshire
People from Saltburn-by-the-Sea
American male singers
American rock musicians
People with acquired American citizenship